Social security in Scotland is delivered through policymaking decisions at three tiers of government; central government, national government, and local government.

Scotland has a comprehensive welfare state, providing social security in many aspects of welfare provision.

Employment support

Employment support is a reserved matter of the United Kingdom Government.

Disability support

Disability support is a matter of the United Kingdom government.

Income support

Income support is a reserved matter of the United Kingdom government

Carer's support

Carer's support is shared between the Scottish and UK governments.

Health and Social Care

Health and social care is a devolved matter of the Scottish Government.

Pensions

Pensions are a reserved matter of the United Kingdom Government.

Housing

Housing is a devolved matter of the Scottish Government, which is jointly administered with local government.

Public policy in Scotland
Welfare in Scotland